Phillip Grayson Sawyer (born 1961) is a retired vice admiral in the United States Navy, who served as the Deputy Chief of Naval Operations for Operations, Plans and Strategy from October 10, 2019 to August 6, 2021. He previously served as commander for naval mine and anti-submarine warfare, and commander of United States Seventh Fleet, stationed at Japan.

Sawyer also served as a commander of Submarine Force, United States Pacific Fleet and commander of Task Force 74/54. As a deputy commander, he served United States Pacific Fleet, and as commander of Seventh Fleet.

Education
Sawyer was born in Phoenix, Arizona. In 1983, he graduated with a Bachelor of Science in Systems Engineering from the United States Naval Academy. Later, he received a master’s degree in Engineering Management from Old Dominion University.

Naval career
As a career submarine officer, Sawyer was a division officer aboard , and an engineering officer aboard . He also served as an executive officer of a Los Angeles-class submarine . Later, he was assigned to command another Los Angeles-class submarine  at Submarine Squadron in Guam when Sawyer was appointed to senior officer present afloat.

On shore, Sawyer was appointed to branch chief in Joint Chiefs of Staff for anti-terrorism and force protection. He was also appointed deputy director for operations at COMPACFLT and executive assistant to the vice commander-in-chief for Pacific Fleet. Later, he served at the Bureau of Naval Personnel as a placement officer and assistant captain detailer. Sawyer was later appointed to Fleet Anti-Submarine Warfare Training Center, Atlantic, where he served as an instructor. He was later appointed to the office of United States Strategic Command as chief of staff for special activities and for submarine force Atlantic.

He is slated to retire at the end of 2021.

References

|-

|-

1961 births
Living people
People from Phoenix, Arizona
United States Naval Academy alumni
Military personnel from Phoenix, Arizona
Old Dominion University alumni
United States submarine commanders
Recipients of the Legion of Merit
United States Navy vice admirals
Recipients of the Defense Superior Service Medal
Recipients of the Navy Distinguished Service Medal